Number 10 Downing Street is the residence and office of the First Lord of the Treasury as Prime Minister of the United Kingdom. The headquarters of His Majesty's Government, it is situated on Downing Street in the City of Westminster in London, England.

Number 10 was originally three houses: a stately mansion overlooking St James's Park called "the house at the back" built around 1530, a modest townhouse behind it located at 10 Downing Street and a small cottage next to Number 10. The townhouse, from which the modern building gets its name, was one of several built by Sir George Downing between 1682 and 1684.

Below is a list of the residents of Number 10 and the House at the Back from 1650 to the present.

Residents of Number 10 Downing Street and The House at the Back, 1650–present
Prime Ministers are indicated in bold.

See also
 Downing Street
 Chief Mouser to the Cabinet Office

References

Further reading
 

10 Downing Street
London-related lists
10 Downing Street